This is a list of the gymnasts who represented their country at the 2016 Summer Olympics in Rio de Janeiro, Brazil from  5–21 August 2016. 319 gymnasts across all three disciplines (artistic gymnastics, rhythmic gymnastics and trampoline) participated in the Games.

Female artistic gymnasts 

Notes
Rune Hermans replaced Axelle Klinckaert after an injury forced her to withdraw.
Tan Jiaxin replaced Liu Tingting after an injury forced her to withdraw.
Ksenia Afanasyeva was named as an alternate for the Russian team but announced her retirement from the sport prior to the Games.
Lee Eun-ju replaced Lee Go-im after an injury forced her to withdraw.

FIG Reserves

Note: Reserve gymnasts/teams in numbered lists are ranked; reserves in unnumbered lists are unranked.

Male artistic gymnasts 

Notes
Nicolas Cordoba replaced Gustavo Simões of Portugal, who had to withdraw after an injury.

FIG Reserves

Rhythmic gymnasts

Individual

Group 

Note: Each NOC may only name 5 gymnasts to the group competition.

FIG Reserves

Male Trampoline gymnasts

FIG Reserve

Female Trampoline gymnasts

FIG Reserve

References

Lists of gymnasts
Gymnastics at the 2016 Summer Olympics

Gymnasts